Fantasian is a 2021 role-playing video game co-developed and published by Hawaii-based studio Mistwalker for iOS devices through the Apple Arcade service. It was produced and written by Hironobu Sakaguchi with music by Nobuo Uematsu, who are best known as the original creators and pioneers behind the Final Fantasy series. The game is split into two parts, with the first released worldwide on April 2, 2021, and the second part released on August 13, 2021.

Plot
The game's plot revolves around Leo, a young man who becomes amnesiac after entering an alternate universe known as the Machine Realm. Various characters join him in his quest to recover his memory and discover who he is, while also confronting the mysterious Vam the Malevolent along the way.

Gameplay

Exploring the world of Fantasian involves players tapping on a location, which Leo will then navigate his way to. As  the player navigates the world, random encounters occur where the player must fight a small group of enemies. During these battles, the game changes to a turn-based RPG. When in combat, the player controls a small party, where during the player's turn, the player can deal physical damage to a single enemy, use items to aid themselves or cure status ailments, or use skills that require magic points such as offensive magic attacks or attacks that hit multiple enemies. When playing on a mobile device, players can swipe on the screen with their finger to select multiple targets to attack. Characters earn experience points after battles that automatically increase their stats when a character "levels up," and a skill tree is accessible towards the end of the first part of the game.

Equipment can be purchased from various stores or obtained by treasure chests scattered throughout the world to increase a character's attack or defence stat. The game features checkpoints and save points that save the player's progress.

A unique element to Fantasian is the "Dimengeon" system which allows players to skip battles against previously encountered enemies. When the "Dimengeon" system is enabled, players do not fight enemies immediately – instead, the enemies are placed into the "Dimengeon", thus allowing players to explore the game's world without interruption. However, the "Dimengeon" can only hold a certain amount of enemies, and once this capacity has been exceeded, the player is forced to fight all of the enemies they have accumulated at once. Various enhancements are available during these "Dimengeon" battles, such as increased attack power or the ability to steal a turn from an enemy, to help the player fight the large amount of enemies.

The game does not contain any microtransactions, a feature of games available through Apple Arcade. The game also has mouse and keyboard support and can be played with controllers such as the DualShock 4.

Development

Fantasian began development in 2018. It was first announced during Apple's introductory video of Apple Arcade on March 25, 2019. The game was developed by Mistwalker, a studio founded by Sakaguchi in 2004. The game was first conceived after Sakaguchi had met with some Apple employees, who were fans of both Final Fantasy and Uematsu's work. After spending some time conceptualizing on possible ideas, Sakaguchi's team wondered if it would be possible to create a game for Apple. The game was created with the Unity game engine.

Conceptually, Sakaguchi felt inspired to go "back to [his] roots" after replaying Final Fantasy VI in 2018 with some of his former colleagues who had worked on the game. Prior to this, the producer had spent time working on mobile games like Party Wave and Blade Guardian, with his last narrative role-playing game being 2011's The Last Story for the Wii. With Fantasian, Sakaguchi wanted to work on something that emulated the Japanese role-playing games (JRPG) of the past, stating that it was a style that he enjoyed and that "old styles can be great in their own right". He also acknowledged that potentially, Fantasian could be his last project due to his age.

Visually, Fantasian uses hand-crafted dioramas, a concept decided upon at the beginning of its development. A miniatures hobbyist, Sakaguchi had previously used hand-crafted elements in the mobile strategy game Terra Wars, and wanted to explore the concept further in a traditional RPG. Unlike the pre-rendered levels from earlier Final Fantasy games, Fantasian used drones equipped with 3D scanning technology to digitally recreate miniature sets built by hand. Over 150 dioramas were created this way. The dioramas were created by veterans of Japan's Tokusatsu industry, including one created by Akira Toriyama of Dragon Ball fame. This process was laborious, and required longer conceptual planning times since the development team could not go back and change things in a 3D modelling program. Despite saying that a game "with a diorama [development] pipeline probably shouldn't exist", Sakaguchi noted that this process was necessary in order to get the appearance he wanted, saying that it offers a "unique handmade touch that cannot be replicated." Due to the challenge of modifying the dioramas, gameplay and story elements were changed to match them instead of the other way around. Sakaguchi developed the Dimengeon system because he felt that random encounter battles would interrupt players' peaceful exploration of the diorama environment.

Fantasian is composed of two parts, with the first part taking 20 to 30 hours to complete, while the second completes the story with an additional 40 to 60 hours of content. The first part was released worldwide on April 2, 2021. The second part was released on August 12.

Music

The game's music was composed by Nobuo Uematsu. Uematsu had previously worked on other Mistwalker titles, and for Fantasian, he composed 60 tracks for its soundtrack and considers Fantasians music as the best soundtrack he has ever made. Alluding to health issues, Uematsu noted that like Sakaguchi, the Fantasian soundtrack could be his last complete soundtrack.

Fantasian's soundtrack consists of a fusion of baroque-style music with synthesizers. Wanting to break free of conventional music found in the JRPG genre, Uematsu experimented with elements like dissonance and ethnic instruments. Some of the music features improvisations, which the composer had never used in his video game soundtracks prior to Fantasian. Over the period of a year, he spent 13 hours per day composing music for the game. The soundtrack became available for streaming through Apple Music in July 2021.

Reception

Fantasian received "generally favorable reviews" according to Metacritic. Particular praise was given to the "Dimengeon" system, the diorama sets, the soundtrack, and the gameplay during battles, while criticism centered around the game's story being a typical JRPG story, navigating the world being somewhat cumbersome via the touch controls, and the game's graphics being subpar when playing the game on higher-resolution devices such as through macOS.

Notes

References 

2021 video games
Apple Arcade games
IOS games
MacOS games
Mistwalker games
Role-playing video games
Single-player video games
Video games developed in Japan
Video games scored by Nobuo Uematsu